Truu is an Estonian surname (meaning "loyal"), and may refer to:
 Elmar Truu (born 1942), Estonian politician and sports pedagogue
 Meeli Truu (1946–2013), Estonian architect
 Silvia Truu (1922–1990), Estonian writer

References

Estonian-language surnames